Superfund sites in New York are designated under the Comprehensive Environmental Response, Compensation, and Liability Act (CERCLA). CERCLA, a federal law passed in 1980, authorized the United States Environmental Protection Agency (EPA) to create a list of polluted locations requiring a long-term response to clean up hazardous material contaminations. These locations are known as Superfund sites, and are placed on the National Priorities List (NPL). The NPL guides the EPA in "determining which sites warrant further investigation" for environmental remediation.  As of October 2013, there were 87 Superfund sites on the NPL in New York. Two new sites have been proposed for addition to the list, and 26 sites have been deleted  from the list following cleanup.

Superfund sites

See also
List of Superfund sites in the United States
List of environmental issues
List of waste types
TOXMAP

References

External links
EPA list of proposed Superfund sites in New York
EPA list of current Superfund sites in New York
EPA list of Superfund site construction completions in New York
EPA list of partially deleted Superfund sites in New York
EPA list of deleted Superfund sites in New York

New York

Superfund